Peter McConnell  (3 March 1937 – 28 July 2019) was an English professional footballer who played as an attacking wing-half for Leeds United, Carlisle United and Bradford City.

Playing career
McConnell was born in Reddish, Cheshire, England. He began his footballing career as a teenager at Leeds United. He made his first team debut during the 1958–59 season in a declining side that was to be relegated to the Second Division at the end of the 1959–60 season. He did not become a regular in the side until the 1961–62 when Leeds were fighting relegation to the Third Division. He was released by manager Don Revie the following season and joined Carlisle United where he made 273 appearances, scoring 27 goals, and won a Third Division Championship medal, in seven seasons. He joined Bradford City in 1969 for who he made a further 79 appearances in two seasons.

Playing statistics

References

1937 births
2019 deaths
English footballers
Leeds United F.C. players
Carlisle United F.C. players
Bradford City A.F.C. players
English Football League players
People from Reddish
Association football midfielders